The Hyundai BlueOn was a limited-production subcompact 5-door hatchback electric car produced by Hyundai Motor Company in 2009–2010. Field testing with 30 units began in South Korea by late 2010 and sales in the domestic market were scheduled for late 2012.

History

According to Hyundai Motor Company, the total investment to develop the BlueOn, its first production electric car, was around 40 billion won. The prototype, an electric version of i10, was first unveiled at the International Motor Show Germany 2009 in Frankfurt. The pre-production testing model was unveiled in Seoul in September 2010, when the first of 30 units were delivered to South Korean government agencies for field testing. The carmaker planned to build 2,500 units by the end of 2012, but sales were limited to the South Korean  market.

Main features
The BlueOn is equipped with a 16.4 kWh  lithium polymer (Li–Poly) battery pack and charges in 6 hours with a 220 V power outlet and in 25 minutes to 80% with three-phase electric power (in a 380 V outlet).

The BlueOn is based on the Hyundai i10 and features an electric warning sound developed by Hyundai called the Virtual Engine Sound System (VESS). The warning system will be included in the BlueOn test fleet and it will provide synthetic audio feedback mimicking the sound of an internal combustion engine (ICE).

See also
Hyundai Elantra LPI Hybrid
Hyundai i10
Hyundai Santa Fe
List of electric cars currently available

References

Production electric cars
BlueOn
Subcompact cars